The Belarusian Green Party (BGP or BPZ; ; , literally "Belarusian Party «The Greens»") is an eco-socialist Green party in Belarus which opposes the administration of president Alexander Lukashenko, led by entrepreneur Dzmitry Kuchuk (Дзмітрый Кучук). It was created in 1994. The party has an anti-corporatist, anti-globalist platform.

History 
The previous leader of the party until January 2020 was Nastassya Darafeyeva (Настасся Дарафеева), who in 2015 succeeded long-time leader Aleh Novikaŭ (Алег Новікаў), also known as Lolik Uškin (Лёлік Ушкін), who had led the party since 2007.

The party has not held seats in the Belarusian parliament since its creation.

Ideology 
In late 2008, the Belarusian Green Party created a special commission on LGBT rights, becoming the first political party in Belarus to officially announce support for the LGBT community.

The Belarusian Green Party opposes the practice of the death penalty, and Belarus remains the last country in Europe with capital punishment. The party has also sharply criticized the US government for continuing to permit the death penalty at a state level. Members of the party strongly protested the executions of Dmitri Konovalov and Vladislav Kovalev, who were convicted of the 2011 Minsk Metro bombing in a controversial trial.

The party is an associate member of the European Green Party.

Electoral history

Presidential elections

Legislative elections

See also 

 Green Party
 Green politics
 List of environmental organizations

References

External links 
  

1994 establishments in Belarus
Ecosocialist parties
European Green Party
Global Greens
Green parties in Europe
Political parties established in 1994
Political parties in Belarus
Socialist parties in Belarus